The Israeli Ministry of Finance (Misrad HaOtzar) is the main economic ministry of the Government of Israel. It is responsible for planning and implementing the Government's overall economic policy, as well as setting targets for fiscal policy, preparing the draft State Budget and monitoring implementation of the approved budget. The ministry also manages state revenues, collects direct and indirect taxes and promotes nonresident investments. In addition, the ministry conducts economic relations with foreign governments, economic organizations and the international community. The ministry regulates the state owned companies sector and the capital market, savings and insurance. The ministry is also responsible for auxiliary units for government ministries in motor vehicles, computer services, printing and government procurement.

The Finance Ministry is headed by the Finance Minister, currently Betzalel Smotrich. There is also occasionally a Deputy Minister of Finance. The permanent staff of the ministry include the Director General, the department directors responsible for the Budget Department, the Accountant General, the Wage and Labor Agreements Department and the accreditation units (the Tax Authority, the Government Companies Authority, the Capital Market, Insurance, and Savings Authority and the Governmental Printer).

Main functions
The units of the Ministry of Finance may be categorized by the three types of service they provide:

 Government staff services – departments that act on behalf of units and operations of the government: budgeting of government operations (Budget Department), operations of the Accountant General, regulation of the state-owned companies (Government Companies Authority), economic services in the United States, and control and auditing of Finance Ministry operations (Internal Audit Unit).
 General economic staff services – departments that act in matters pertaining to the economy at large: management of state revenues (State Revenue Administration), and regulation of the capital market, insurance, and savings (Capital Market, Insurance, and Savings Department). The Tax Authority implements the Income Tax and Property Tax ordinances, Customs, and VAT.
 Auxiliary services for government ministries – motor-vehicle services (Government Vehicle Administration), computer services for the tax departments (Computer Service), printing (the Government Printer, a business enterprise owned by the Ministry of Finance) and Government Procurement Administration.

List of ministers

Deputy ministers

See also
Economy of Israel
Bank of Israel
Standard of living in Israel

References

External links
Israeli Ministry of Finance 
Israeli Ministry of Finance 
Past Ministers at Finance Israel
All Ministers in the Ministry of Finance Knesset website

Finance
Ministry of Finance
Finance
 
Israel